The 2000–01 Northern Premier League season was the 33rd in the history of the Northern Premier League, a football competition in England. Teams were divided into two divisions; the Premier and the First.

Premier Division 

The Premier Division featured three new teams:

 Altrincham relegated from the Football Conference
 Accrington Stanley promoted as champions of Division One
 Burscough promoted as runners up of Division One

League table

Results

Division One 

Division One featured four new teams:

 Guiseley relegated from the Premier Division
 Winsford United relegated from the Premier Division
 North Ferriby United promoted as champions of the Northern Counties East League Premier Division
 Vauxhall Motors promoted as champions of the North West Counties League Division One

League table

Results

Promotion and relegation 

In the thirty-third season of the Northern Premier League Stalybridge Celtic (as champions) were automatically promoted to the Football Conference. Leek Town and Spennymoor United were relegated to the First Division; these two clubs were replaced by First Division winners Bradford Park Avenue, second placed Vauxhall Motors and readmitted Burton Albion (returning from the Southern League Premier Division. In the First Division Winsford United and Congleton Town left the League at the end of the season and were replaced by newly admitted Rossendale United and Ossett Albion.

Cup Results
Challenge Cup: Teams from both leagues.

Lancaster City bt. Bishop Auckland

President's Cup: 'Plate' competition for losing teams in the NPL Cup.

Stalybridge Celtic bt. Blyth Spartans

Chairman's Cup: 'Plate' competition for losing teams in the NPL Cup.

Barrow bt. Harrogate Town

Peter Swales Shield: Between Champions of NPL Premier Division and Winners of the NPL Cup.

Stalybridge Celtic bt. Lancaster City

References
 http://www.thefootballarchives.com/network/competition.php?CID=13&Season=2000-2001
 http://www.thefootballarchives.com/network/competition.php?CID=71&Season=2000-2001

External links 
 Northern Premier League Tables at RSSSF

Northern Premier League seasons
6